Sir James Dalrymple-Horn-Elphinstone, 2nd Baronet  (20 November 1805 – 26 December 1886) was a British  Conservative Party politician who sat in the House of Commons in two periods between 1857 and 1880.

Dalrymple-Horn-Elphinstone was the son of Sir Robert Dalrymple-Home-Elphinstone, 1st 
Baronet and his wife Graeme Hepburn daughter of Colonel Hepburn, of Keith. He was educated at the Musselburgh Grammar School. He served as a naval officer for the Honourable East India Company for many years and retired as Commander in 1834. In 1848, he inherited the baronetcy on the death of his father. He was a J.P. and Deputy Lieutenant for Aberdeenshire.

Dalrymple-Horn-Elphinstone stood for parliament unsuccessfully at Greenock in 1852. He was elected Member of Parliament for Portsmouth in 1857 and held the seat until 1865 when he was defeated. He stood unsuccessfully at Aberdeenshire in 1866. At the 1868 general election he was re-elected for Portsmouth and held the seat until 1880.

He died in 1886 at the age of 81.

Family

Dalrymple-Horn-Elphinstone married Mary Heron Maxwell, daughter of Lieutenant-general Sir John Heron-Maxwell, 4th Baronet, in April 1836.

His younger brother Charles Elphinstone-Dalrymple (sic) FSA(Scot) (1817-1891) was a noted antiquarian, geneaologist and expert on topography. He was a member of the Spalding Club.

References

External links

1805 births
1886 deaths
Conservative Party (UK) MPs for English constituencies
UK MPs 1857–1859
UK MPs 1859–1865
UK MPs 1868–1874
UK MPs 1874–1880
Baronets in the Baronetage of the United Kingdom
Deputy Lieutenants of Aberdeenshire
British East India Company Marine personnel